The 1995 GP Ouest-France was the 59th edition of the GP Ouest-France cycle race and was held on 27 August 1995. The race started and finished in Plouay. The race was won by Rolf Järmann of the MG Maglificio team.

General classification

References

1995
1995 in road cycling
1995 in French sport